{{Infobox film
| name           = Trigger, Jr.
| image          = Trigger_jr.jpg
| caption        = Film poster
| director       = William Witney
| producer       =
| writer         =
| narrator       =
| starring       = Roy Rogers
| music          =
| cinematography =
| editing        =
| studio         = Republic Pictures<ref name=Voice>Farran Smith Nehme, "Restorations From Republic Pictures Reveal a Studio That Got Its Hands Dirty", The Village Voice, February 6, 2018. Retrieved February 7, 2021.</ref>
| distributor    = Republic Pictures
| released       = 
| runtime        = 68 minutes
| country        = United States
| language       = English
| budget         =
}} Trigger, Jr.'' is a 1950 American Western film directed by William Witney and starring Roy Rogers, his horse Trigger, and Dale Evans. It was one of a series of Roy Rogers films produced by Republic Pictures.

Plot

Cast
Roy Rogers
Dale Evans
Trigger
Pat Brady
Gordon Jones
Grant Withers
Peter Miles
George Cleveland
Frank Fenton
Foy Willing and the Riders of the Purple Sage (band)

References

External links
 

1950 films
1950 Western (genre) films
Republic Pictures films
Films about horses
American Western (genre) films
Films directed by William Witney
Trucolor films
1950s English-language films
1950s American films